Out of the Dawn is a novel by F. J. Thwaites.

References

External links
Out of the Dawn at AustLit

1945 Australian novels